Stiaan van Zyl (born 19 September 1987) is a South African cricketer who most recently played for Sussex County Cricket Club as a left-handed batsman who bowls right-arm medium pace.

Previously, he represented his national side before ending his career by signing Kolpak deal. He made his debut for Boland in the SAA Provincial Challenge against Kei. He usually opened in limited overs games when Graeme Smith or Robin Peterson were absent.

He made his Test match debut for South Africa against the West Indies on 17 December 2014 at SuperSport Park in Centurion, scoring a century. He became the 100th batsman to score a century on debut in Test cricket.

In April 2021, he was named in Boland's squad, ahead of the 2021–22 cricket season in South Africa.

See also
List of Test cricket centuries scored on debut

References

External links
 

1987 births
Living people
Cricketers from Cape Town
South African cricketers
Boland cricketers
Cape Cobras cricketers
Western Province cricketers
Sussex cricketers
Cricketers who made a century on Test debut
Chattogram Challengers cricketers